Toledo Speedway is a half-mile paved oval racetrack located in Toledo, Ohio, United States. It is owned jointly by Roy Mott and ARCA President Ron Drager. It is operated by ARCA and run as the sister track to Flat Rock Speedway in Flat Rock, Michigan.

History
Toledo Speedway opened in 1960 and was paved in 1964. In 1978 it was sold to Thomas "Sonny" Adams Sr. The speedway was reacquired by ARCA in 1999. The track also features the weekly racing divisions of sportsman on the half-mile and Figure 8, factory stock, and four cylinders on a quarter-mile track inside the big track. They also have a series of races with outlaw-bodied late models that includes four 100-lap races and ends with Glass City 200. The track hosts the “Fastest short track show in the world” which features winged sprints and winged Super Modifieds on the half mile. Toledo also used to host a 200-lap late model race until its sale to ARCA in 1999. 

Toledo is known for the foam blocks that line the race track, different than the concrete walls that line many short tracks throughout America. The crumbling walls can make track cleanup a tedious task for workers.

Toledo was one of the oldest tracks to still host an ARCA Menards Series race until 2019. Starting in 2020, after NASCAR bought ARCA, the race became part of the rebranded ARCA Menards Series East (former NASCAR K&N Pro Series East). However, due to COVID-19 related scheduling changes, the track ended up hosting three ARCA races in 2020, and is back on the national schedule in 2021.

National events
Toledo, as a track owned by the Automobile Racing Club of America, plays host to an ARCA Menards Series East race, the Sioux Chief PowerPEX 200 in early October as the Final race of the season. The USAC Silver Crown Series also visits the track. A touring super late model series, the ARCA/CRA Super Series, also holds an event at Toledo.

References

External links
 Official Website
 Toledo Speedway race results at Racing Reference
 Toledo Speedway race results at The Third Turn

Buildings and structures in Toledo, Ohio
Motorsport venues in Ohio
NASCAR tracks
ARCA Menards Series tracks
Tourist attractions in Toledo, Ohio